Murmur usually means:
 Quiet or indistinct speech
Breathy voice, a type of phonation in speech, also known as a "murmured voice"
Heart murmur, a pathologic heart sound produced as a result of turbulent blood

Murmur can also refer to:

Music
Murmur (album), the 1983 debut R.E.M. album
Murmur (EP), a 2009 EP by The Sight Below
Murmur (record label), an imprint of Sony Music Australia
Murmur, a 2007 album by Yoko Shimomura
 "Murmur", a song by John Frusciante from the 2001 album From the Sounds Inside
Murmurs (album), a 2006 album by Caroline Lufkin album
The Murmurs, an American band

Characters
Murmur (DC Comics), a male supervillain from The Flash comic book
Murmur (Marvel Comics), a female psychic superhero from the group Alpha Flight or a different male mutant character related to Hellions
Murmur (demon), a Great Duke and Earl of Hell
 James "Murmur" Zancone, a character in The Sopranos (played by Lenny Venito)
 Murmur, a minor character in the manga and anime series Future Diary

Computing
 Murmur, the corresponding server to the communication software Mumble (software)
MurmurHash, a non-cryptographic hash function

Other uses
Murmur (film), a Canadian docufiction film
mürmur, a New York City podcast
Murmur (placoderm), a genus of placoderms
 Murmuration, a group of starlings
Mur Murs, documentary film